The 2016 Colorado Springs Switchbacks FC season is the club's second year of existence, and their second season in the Western Conference of the United Soccer League, the third tier of the United States Soccer Pyramid.

Roster

Competitions

Preseason

USL Regular season

Standings

Matches

Schedule source

U.S. Open Cup

Friendlies

References

2016 USL season
American soccer clubs 2016 season
2016 in sports in Colorado
Colorado Springs Switchbacks FC seasons